Archduchess Rosa Maria Antonie Roberta Josepha Anna Walburga Carmela Ignazia Rita de Cascia of Austria (German: Rosa Maria Antonie Roberta Josepha Anna Walburga Carmela Ignazia Rita de Cascia, Erzherzogin von Österreich; 22 September 1906 – 17 September 1983) was a member of the Tuscan branch of the House of Habsburg-Lorraine and an Archduchess of Austria and Princess of Bohemia, Hungary, and Tuscany by birth. Through her marriage to Philipp Albrecht, Duke of Württemberg, Rosa was also a member of the House of Württemberg and Duchess consort of Württemberg.

Early life
Rosa was the youngest child and third daughter of Archduke Peter Ferdinand, Prince of Tuscany, and his wife, Princess Maria Cristina of Bourbon-Two Sicilies. Rosa was raised with her three siblings in Salzburg and Vienna until the end of World War I in 1918, when her family emigrated and moved to Lucerne, Switzerland.

Marriage and issue
Rosa married Philipp Albrecht, Duke of Württemberg, eldest child and son of Albrecht, Duke of Württemberg, and his wife, Archduchess Margarete Sophie of Austria, on 1 August 1928 in Friedrichshafen. Rosa and Philipp Albrecht had two sons and four daughters:

 Duchess Helene of Württemberg (29 June 1929 – 22 April 2021), married in 1961 to Marquess Federico Pallavicini, with issue.
 Duke Ludwig Albrecht of Württemberg (23 October 1930 – 6 October 2019), married twice morganatically, with issue.
 Duchess Elisabeth of Württemberg (2 February 1933 – 27 January 2022), married in 1958 to Prince Antoine of Bourbon-Two Sicilies.
 Duchess Marie-Thérèse of Württemberg (born 12 November 1934), married in 1957 to Prince Henri d'Orléans.
 Carl, Duke of Württemberg (1 August 1936 – 7 June 2022), head of the House of Württemberg from 1975 until his death in 2022; married Princess Diane of Orléans.
 Duchess Maria Antonia of Württemberg (31 August 1937 – 12 November 2004).

Ancestry

References

|-

|-

1906 births
1983 deaths
People from Salzburg
House of Habsburg-Lorraine
Austrian princesses
Duchesses of Württemberg